The Campinas Brazil Temple, in Campinas, São Paulo, is the 111th operating temple of the Church of Jesus Christ of Latter-day Saints (LDS Church).

The temple was the fourth to be built in Brazil.

History
The first Mormon missionaries arrived in Brazil in the 1920s. Most of the early converts in Brazil were German immigrants coming to Brazil after World War I. In 1931, the 80 members of the small branch near São Paulo built the first LDS meetinghouse in Brazil. During World War II Mormon missionaries were removed from Brazil, but when missionaries returned after the war Brazilian natives began joining the church by the hundreds. Church membership in Brazil continues to grow quickly. The Campinas Temple serves more than 117,000 members from 36 stakes in the area. Brazil is home to more Latter-day Saints than any other country in the world, except the United States and Mexico. Plans to build the Campinas Brazil Temple were announced on April 3, 1997.

A groundbreaking ceremony and site dedication were held on May 1, 1998. It was presided over by James E. Faust a member of the First Presidency, who had served as a missionary in Brazil in the 1940s. The temple site has . The site is on a hill overlooking the 1 million-population city of Campinas and can easily be seen from all around. Hundreds of people came for the groundbreaking ceremony and site dedication.

The temple was open to the public April 20, 2002 through May 11, 2002. Tens of thousands of people were able to take a tour through the temple and learn more about its sacred importance. LDS Church president Gordon B. Hinckley dedicated the Campinas Brazil Temple on May 17, 2002. Four sessions were held which allowed thousands to attend the dedication. Before the dedication, Hinckley met with a large group outside and the final cornerstone was placed in the temple. The construction was then officially completed.

In 2020, the Campinas Brazil Temple was closed temporarily during the year in response to the coronavirus pandemic.

See also

 Comparison of temples of The Church of Jesus Christ of Latter-day Saints
 List of temples of The Church of Jesus Christ of Latter-day Saints
 List of temples of The Church of Jesus Christ of Latter-day Saints by geographic region
 Temple architecture (Latter-day Saints)
 The Church of Jesus Christ of Latter-day Saints in Brazil

References

External links
 Official Campinas Brazil Temple page
 Campinas Brazil Temple at ChurchofJesusChristTemples.org

21st-century Latter Day Saint temples
Religious buildings and structures in São Paulo (state)
Buildings and structures in Campinas
Temples (LDS Church) completed in 2002
Temples (LDS Church) in Brazil
2002 establishments in Brazil